Andrey Remnev (Андрей Владимирович Ремнёв) (born 1962, Yakhroma, USSR) — modern Russian painter.

The greatest popularity in the art world Remnev has gained for the paintings with visual motifs of Russian provincial life.

Biography and works
He was born into a family of doctors. In 1983 he graduated from the Moscow Art School in memory of 1905. He completed the Surikov's Moscow State Art Institute, where he was one of the first to write a thesis on a religion-related theme. In 1996 he began an eight-year study of iconography under the guidance of the icon painter Fr. Vyacheslav (Savinykh) in Andronikov Monastery. He kept working on religious themes in 2000-2010: he painted the plafond of the chapel next to this monastery, as well as the large icon for the Diveyevo Convent.

In his own words the artist's technique is based on the combination of methods employed in the old Russian icon painting, Russian artworks of the XVIII century, composition methods of the "Art world" and Russian constructivism. The art historian Eugene Steiner characterizes Remnev as one of the extraordinary contemporary artists who can paint carnation. Remnev uses medieval painting techniques and makes natural paints on the basis of egg yolk.

In the mid-2010s, Remnev’s art took a new direction — he became interested in sketches from the life of contemporary Russian ballet dancers (carrying on the traditions of the “Silver age” artists). A large series of sketches was made in 2017 in Perm during Stravinsky's ballet performance as a part of the Diaghilev festival. Some of the works were publishes in the booklet released by the theater for the ballet premieres. During this period at the invitation of a principal dancer Artem Ovcharenko and ballerina Olga Smirnova, Remnev started painting in the classroom and behind the stage of the Bolshoi Ballet. The series of works was created about the staging of John Neumeier’s "La Dame aux Camélias". He also made sketches from the rehearsals of the orchestra MusicAeterna, graphic portraits of Teodor Currentzis, Natalia Osipova, Olga Smirnova, Artem Ovcharenko, B. B. Akimov, Oksana Kardash and David Motta Soares. A separate easel series was devoted to the Diaghilev seasons. Remnev puts a significant amount of time into the work as a portraitist for private customers. One of his portraits from a private collection took part in a representative exhibition of The Russian Museum "Portrait of the family" (2014) as an example of the latter-day genre — modern Russian custom portrait.

Personal exhibitions of the artist were held in Moscow, Ryazan, Sergiev Posad, Dmitrov, The Hague, Trenton, other cities. He is the artistic director of the plein air and the jury member of the international youth festival "Russian Spring" (Bavaria 2012, Barcelona 2013, Paris 2014). He is a professor at Surikov's Moscow State Art Institute and an honorary member of the International Academy of Culture and Art.

The works of Remnev based on Russian motifs, inspired foreign designers. The fall-winter 2015 collection of the Spanish designer "Delposo" was created under the impression of Remnev's works, and the spring-summer 2018 collection of the Italian fashion label "Vivetta" was created in a collaboration with the artist.

Bibliography
 Александр Шестимиров. «Андрей Ремнев». М., Белый город, 2006.

References

External links
 Official page

21st-century Russian painters
1962 births
Living people